Who Knows may refer to:

 'Who Knows? (album), a DVD by Andrew W.K.
 Who Knows? (film) (Va savoir), a 2001 French romantic comedy-drama
 Who Knows? (game show), a 1959 Canadian television panel game quiz show
 "Who Knows", a song by Avril Lavigne from Under My Skin
 "Who Knows", a song by Natasha Bedingfield from N.B.
 "Who Knows", a song by Jimi Hendrix from Band of Gypsys
 "Who Knows?", a short story by Guy de Maupassant, published in 1890

See also 
 "Who Knows Who", a collaborative song by Muse and The Streets